Rafferty, from Ó Raifeartaigh, is an Irish surname, and may refer to:
Anne Rafferty (born 1950), The Right Honourable Lady Justice Rafferty (wife of Judge Brian Barker)
Anne Marie Rafferty (born 1958), British nurse and academic
Barbara Rafferty (born 1950), Scottish actress
Bill Rafferty (1944–2012), American comedian
Billy Rafferty (born 1950), Scottish footballer
Chips Rafferty (1909–1971), Australian actor
Claire Rafferty (actress) (born 1982), Northern Irish actress
Claire Rafferty (born 1989), English footballer
Damien Rafferty ( 2010s), Irish Gaelic footballer
Frances Rafferty (1922–2004), American actress and dancer
Gerry Rafferty (1947–2011), Scottish singer
John K. Rafferty (1938-2021), American lawyer and politician
Kevin Rafferty (1948–2020), American filmmaker
Larry Rafferty, American entrepreneur
Max Rafferty (1917–1982), American educator and politician
Martin Rafferty, is an American activist and philanthropist
Ronan Rafferty (born 1964), Northern Irish golfer
Sara Greenberger Rafferty (born 1978), American artist
Sarah Rafferty (born 1972), American television and film actress
Lochlainn O'Raifeartaigh (1933–2000), Irish physicist

See also
Rafferty (TV series), a 1977 series starring Patrick McGoohan
Rafferty's Rules
Raftery
Raffertie

Surnames of Irish origin